The Sheepshead Bay Stakes is a Grade II American thoroughbred horse race for fillies and mares ages four-years-old and older run over a distance of one and three-eighth miles on the turf scheduled annually in early May at Belmont Park in Elmont, New York.

History
The first Sheepshead Bay Handicap was a race run from 1888 through 1910 at the now defunct Sheepshead Bay Race Track at Sheepshead Bay, New York. When the Sheepshead Bay Race Track closed the event was discontinued.

Renewal Sheepshead Bay Handicap (1957–) 

The event was revived at the Jamaica Race Course on 26 October 1957 as a six furlong sprint named the Sheepshead Bay Handicap for three-year-olds and older and was won by Be Jeepers in a time 1:11 The event was not held in 1958. In 1959 the event was held at Jamaica Race Course for the last time in mid July at a distance of  miles and was won by the 40-1 longshot Greek Star. With the closure of the Jamaica Race Course the event was transferred to Aqueduct Racetrack and held on the new turf track. In 1962 the conditions of the event were change that the event was for fillies and mares three-years-old or older. The event was scheduled to be run on the turf track but was transferred to the dirt and held over a distance of one mile due to cancellation of all turf racing for the rest of their summer meeting after an incident the previous Saturday.

In 1963 the distance of the event was reduced to  miles and was won by the reigning U.S. Champion Three-Year-Old Filly Cicada who carried an imposing weight of 128 pounds winning by a neck over Nubile. Cicada would later be crowned the 1963 U.S. Champion Older Female Horse. 
 
In 1965 the distance of the event was increased to  miles and was run until 1974 at that journey.  The event continued to be held in July during Aqueduct's short summer meeting.

The Sheepshead Bay was run in two divisions five times, four times at Aqueduct and after the event was moved permanently to Belmont Park in 1982. In the running of the Second Division of the event in 1970 the winner Pattee Canyon carried a record 132 pounds. 

In 1973 the first year the classification system was enacted, the event was set with Grade II status.

The 1974 running was moved of the turf after a week of prolonged wet weather. In 1975 the event was held at Belmont Park over a distance of  miles. 

In 1976 the event was held back at Aqueduct at a distance of  miles and US Hall of Fame jockey Pat Day won both divisions of the event - On Glowing Tribute and Fleet Victress. In 1977 the event was moved to Belmont Park where it has been held since. Glowing Tribute won the event again ridden by US Hall of Fame jockey Jorge Velásquez setting a new track record for the  miles in 1:59.

In 1980 the distance was increased to the current  miles.

In 1983 Henryk de Kwiatkowski's owned and trained by the US Hall of Fame trainer Woody Stephens Sabin won this event as a three-year-old filly. Sabin won the following year carrying 125 pounds to victory.

In 1990 the event was moved off the turf and was downgraded to Grade III. It held this classification status until 1995 when it was upgraded back to Grade II.

In 1997 Maxzene set a new stakes record in winning in 2:11.57 which stands today. The 2003 longshot winner Mariensky ridden John R. Velazquez by won the event by a record of  lengths on a soft track in a slow time of 2:28.19. In 2009 the conditions of the event were changed from handicap to stakes allowance and the name of the event was modified to the Sheepshead Bay Stakes.

In 2014 the conditions of the event were changed so that three-year-old fillies would not be allowed to enter.

In 2020 due to the COVID-19 pandemic in the United States, NYRA did not schedule the event.

Records

Speed  record: 
 miles – 2:11.57 Maxzene  (1997)
 miles – 1:59.60 Glowing Tribute (1977)
 miles – 1:54.80 Indian Sunlite (1967), Ludham (IRE) (1968)

Margins:
 lengths  –	Mariensky (2003)

Most wins:
 2 –  Princess Pout  (1970, 1971)
 2 –  Glowing Tribute  (1976, 1977)
 2 –  Sabin (1983, 1984)
 2 –  Maxzene  (1997, 1998)
 2 –  Honey Ryder  (2006, 2007)
 2 –  Sea Calisi  (2016, 2017)

Most wins by an owner:
 4 – Darby Dan Farm & John W. Phillips   (1973, 1987, 1989, 1999)

Most wins by a jockey:
 5 – Mike E. Smith (1991, 1993, 1997, 1999, 2004)

Most wins by a trainer:
 5 – Chad C. Brown (2015, 2016, 2017, 2019, 2022)

Winners

Legend:

 
 

Notes:

§ Ran as an entry

Initial Sheepshead Bay Handicap (1888–1910)
The original Sheepshead Bay Handicap was open to horses age three and older and was contested on dirt at a distance of one mile (8 furlongs). It was last run in June 1910 after the Republican controlled New York Legislature under Governor Charles Evans Hughes passed the Hart–Agnew anti-betting legislation on June 11, 1908. The owners of Sheepshead Bay Race Track, and other racing facilities in New York State, struggled to stay in business without betting. However, further restrictive legislation was passed by the New York Legislature in 1910 which resulted in the deepening of the financial crisis for track operators and led to a complete shut down of racing across the state during 1911 and 1912. When a Court ruling saw racing return in 1913 it was too late for the Sheepshead Bay facility and it never reopened.

Historical notes
Sir Walter finished third in the two editions of the race when it was won by Don Alonzo in 1894 and the following year by future U.S. Racing Hall of Fame inductee, Domino. In 1900, another future Hall of Fame inductee, Imp, finished third to longshot winner Greyfeld. A third future Hall of Fame inductee, the great filly Maskette, ran second to King James in the final edition in 1910.

Records
Speed record:
 1:37.60 – Inquisitor (1906) & King James (1910)

Most wins:
 No horse won this race more than once.

Most wins by a jockey:
 3 – Fred Taral (1895, 1896, 1898)
 3 – Walter Miller (1905, 1906, 1908)

Most wins by an owner:
 No owner won this event more than once.

Winners

Earlier winners
 1893 – Pickpocket
 1892 – Tournament
 1891 – Ridge Morrow
 1890 – Loantaka
 1889 – King Crab
 1888 – Terra Cotta

See also
List of American and Canadian Graded races

References

Graded stakes races in the United States
Grade 2 stakes races in the United States
Horse races in New York (state)
Middle distance horse races for fillies and mares
Turf races in the United States
Recurring sporting events established in 1888
Belmont Park
Sheepshead Bay Race Track
1888 establishments in New York (state)